Dialogue of Shadows is a 2013 French-Swiss short drama film directed by Jean-Marie Straub, starring Cornelia Geiser and Bertrand Brouder. It follows a man and a woman who converse about love and the weight of history. The film is based on a short story by Georges Bernanos.

Cast
 Cornelia Geiser as Françoise
 Bertrand Brouder as Jacques

Production
Jean-Marie Straub and his partner Danièle Huillet originally planned to adapt Georges Bernanos' 1928 short story "Dialogue d'ombres" in 1954. They made some preparations but soon abandoned the project. Straub revived the project in the summer of 2012, several years after Huilet's death. According to Straub he wanted to make the film because he found the right location on the countryside of Normandy.

The film was produced through Switzerland's Belva Film and France's Andolfi. The actors rehearsed for six months. Filming began on 15 June 2013 and lasted ten days. The crew consisted of eight people.

Release
The film premiered at the 2013 Vienna International Film Festival. It was released in French cinemas on 11 March 2015, together with Straub's film A propos de Venise.

References

2013 films
2013 drama films
2013 short films
Films based on short fiction
Films based on works by Georges Bernanos
Films directed by Jean-Marie Straub and Danièle Huillet
French drama short films
2010s French-language films
2010s French films